The Brink is the second studio album by Australian indie rock band The Jezabels. It was self-released on 31 January 2014 and internationally, through PIAS Recordings and Dine Alone Records. The album was recorded in London with producer Dan Grech-Marguerat. Lead single "The End" was released on 18 October 2013, with its music video uploaded on the group's official YouTube channel on 14 November. The track reached number 81 on the Australian ARIA Singles Chart. The album debuted at number 2 on the Australian ARIA Albums Chart. It received generally mixed reviews from critics.

Prior to the release of the album, the group made a webisode series documenting the recording process. On the differences between their first and second albums, Hayley Mary told news.com.au: "We were facing the second album thing which is a cliche but it's straight-up true. The second album is hard. Working with a new producer, new label involved, away from our families and Dave our manager, it was different. But lyrically, the album is more a year in the life of (me as) a person because I have always pretended things were not about me in the lyrics. This one is personal."

Track listing
All tracks written by Hayley Mary, Heather Shannon, Sam Lockwood, and Nik Kaloper.

Personnel
 Christopher Doyle – art direction, design
 Duncan Fuller – engineer
 Dan Grech-Marguerat – engineer, mixing, producer, programming
 The Jezabels – composer, primary artist
 Nik Kaloper – group member
 Samuel Lockwood – group member
 Hayley Mary – group member
 Lachlan Mitchell – pre-production
 Jarek Puczel – artwork
 Heather Shannon – group member
 Christian Wright – mastering

Charts

References

2014 albums
The Jezabels albums
Dine Alone Records albums
PIAS Recordings albums